KBXI (92.5 FM, "Mojo 92.5") is a commercial radio station licensed in Park City, Montana, broadcasting to the Billings, Montana, area. KBXI airs a variety hits music format. Licensed to Park City, Montana, United States, the station serves the Billings area. The station is currently owned by local radio personality Kurt Anthony, through licensee Anthony Media Inc. Anthony also operates Twang 107.5.

The station features classic rock, adult hits, & pop music hybrid format with a twist, featuring a variety of local live on-air radio hosts.

The list include the following well-known Billings radio personalities: Kurt Anthony, Charlie Fox, Rockin' Rob, and Major Dan (Mojo) Miller.

References

External links

BXI
Adult hits radio stations in the United States
Radio stations established in 1983
1983 establishments in Montana